Bill Clinton, a Democrat from Arkansas, was elected President of the United States on November 3, 1992 and was inaugurated as the nation's 42nd president on January 20, 1993. Re-elected on November 5, 1996, his second inauguration was on January 20, 1997, and his presidency ended on January 20, 2001 with the inauguration of George W. Bush. The following articles cover the timeline of Clinton's presidency, and the time leading up to it:

 Pre-presidency: 1991–1993
Bill Clinton 1992 presidential campaign
Presidential transition of Bill Clinton
 Presidency: 1993–2001
Timeline of the Bill Clinton presidency (1993)
Timeline of the Bill Clinton presidency (1994)
Timeline of the Bill Clinton presidency (1995)
Timeline of the Bill Clinton presidency (1996)
Timeline of the Bill Clinton presidency (1997)
Timeline of the Bill Clinton presidency (1998)
Timeline of the Bill Clinton presidency (1999)
Timeline of the Bill Clinton presidency (2000–2001)

See also
 Timeline of the George H. W. Bush presidency, for his predecessor
 Timeline of the George W. Bush presidency, for his successor

Clinton, Bill
Presidency of Bill Clinton